Samoa competed at the 2017 World Aquatics Championships in Budapest, Hungary from 14 July to 30 July.

Swimming

Samoa has received a Universality invitation from FINA to send three swimmers (one man and two women) to the World Championships.

References

Nations at the 2017 World Aquatics Championships
Samoa at the World Aquatics Championships
2017 in Samoan sport